, stylized as ARTSVISION, is a Japanese talent agency based in Yoyogi, Shibuya, Tokyo that employs many high-profile voice actors. It was founded in 1984 by Sakumi Matsuda.

General information
Arts Vision was founded by former Tokyo Actor's Consumer's Cooperative Society manager Sakumi Matsuda as an independent corporation in 1984.

The studio became famous in the 1990s during a boom time in the popularity of voice actors and voice-over acting. At its peak, the studio employed many of Japan's most popular voice actors, who became known as "Seiyū Idols." In 1997, however, many of those popular young performers moved to I'm Enterprise, a subsidiary agency also managed by Matsuda. Since that time few new performers have joined Arts Vision.

In 2003, Chihiro Suzuki and Masumi Asano moved from I'm Enterprise to Arts Vision, but in subsequent years the trend has been in the opposite direction, with artists such as Yukari Tamura and Natsuko Kuwatani moving from Arts Vision to I'm Enterprise.

Currently attached voice actors

Female

Sayaka Aida
Yuri Amano
Azumi Asakura
Saki Fujita
Natsumi Fujiwara
Tomoe Hanba
Yumi Hara
Anzu Haruno
Risa Hayamizu
Lynn
Akiko Koike
Akiko Kōmoto
Satsumi Matsuda
Miyuki Matsushita
Kaori Mizuhashi
Eriko Nakamura
Miki Narahashi
Manami Numakura
Chika Sakamoto
Asami Shimoda
Sayumi Suzushiro
Ayaka Suwa
Yoshino Takamori
Fujiko Takimoto
Chiharu Tezuka
Haruka Yamazaki
Kozue Yoshizumi
Ayaka Yamashita
Asami Yoshida
Masako Miura
Akiko Hasegawa
Hiyori Nitta
Hikari Tachibana
Reiko Suzuki
Maki Kawase
Sayori Ishizuka
Hina Tachibana

Male

Eisuke Asakura
Isshin Chiba
Jun Fukushima
Masao Harada
Jun Hazumi
Nobuyuki Hiyama
Yūya Hirose
Sōichirō Hoshi
Mitsuaki Hoshino
Osamu Hosoi
Satoru Inoue
Jun Inoue
Tomoaki Maeno
Yūji Mikimoto
Takashi Nagasako
Tomomichi Nishimura
Akira Sasanuma
Haruo Satō
Ikuya Sawaki
Wataru Takagi
Ken Takeuchi
Nobuo Tobita
Kohsuke Toriumi
Yūichirō Umehara
Takumi Watanabe
Daiki Yamashita
Daiki Hamano
Kohsuke Toriumi

Formerly attached voice actors

Kae Araki
Yu Asakawa - went freelance (since October 2014)
Masumi Asano - moved to Aoni Production (since 2007)
Sachiko Chijimatsu - moved to 81 Produce
Megumi Hayashibara - founded independent agency Woodpark Office
Yui Horie -  moved to VIMS (since 2007)
Asami Imai -  moved to Early Wing
Yūki Kaji -  moved to VIMS
Yumiko Kobayashi - went freelance (since 2007)
Mami Kosuge  moved to Production Ace
Kotono Mitsuishi - went freelance (since 2007)
Toshiyuki Morikawa - founded new agency Axl One (since April 2011)
Reizō Nomoto - attached at time of death (2006)
Kumi Sakuma -  moved to Amuleto
Nozomu Sasaki -  moved to 81 Produce
Hekiru Shiina -  moved to Voice Kit (since February, 2021)
Chihiro Suzuki - went freelance (since February 1, 2010)
Kenichi Suzumura - founded new agency INTENTION (since April 2012)
Chiaki Takahashi - went freelance
Yukari Tamura -  moved to I'm Enterprise (since 2007)
Nao Tōyama -  moved to INTENTION
Narumi Tsunoda -  moved to Honey Rush (since 2007)
Yumi Uchiyama -  moved to Office Osawa (since 2017)
Yuji Ueda -  moved to Osawa Production
Chisa Yokoyama - founded new agency Banbina
Kaoru Fujino - went freelance
Yayoi Jinguji - attached at time of death (2017)
Masayo Kurata - moved to 81 Produce
Yūko Sasamoto - moved to Apte Pro
Kumiko Watanabe - moved to Sigma Seven
Miho Yamada - moved to Crazy Box
Atsushi Ii - attached at time of death (2020)
Yoshio Kawai
Hironori Miyata - moved to Best Position
Kazuo Oka - attached at time of death (2021)
Katsumi Suzuki - moved to 81 Produce

External links
Arts Vision web site

Japanese voice actor management companies
Entertainment companies established in 1984